Trespass is a 2011 American crime thriller film directed by Joel Schumacher, from a screenplay by Karl Gajdusek. It stars Nicolas Cage and Nicole Kidman as a married couple taken hostage by extortionists. It also stars Ben Mendelsohn, Cam Gigandet, Liana Liberato, Jordana Spiro, Dash Mihok, Emily Meade and Nico Tortorella.

It had its world premiere at the Toronto International Film Festival on September 14, 2011.  It was released in a limited release and through video on demand on October 14, 2011, by Millennium Entertainment. It is the last film to be directed by Joel Schumacher before his death on June 22, 2020.

Plot
The film opens with fast-talking businessman and diamond dealer Kyle Miller (Nicolas Cage) speaking to a client over the phone as he returns to his lavish mansion home in Shreveport, Louisiana, his wife Sarah (Nicole Kidman) and his teenage daughter Avery (Liana Liberato). Despite the charming facade, it is immediately clear that the family is dysfunctional and emotionally distant: Avery disrespects her parents and, despite being forbidden to do so, sneaks out of the house to go to a party with her friend Kendra, at the home of a guy named Jake. Sarah appears bored with life as a housewife and yearns for more in her marriage while Kyle seems to harbor a hidden aversion towards his wife. Just as Kyle is about to leave for a business transaction, the house is suddenly invaded by a gang of robbers masquerading as police.

The thieves - consisting of leader Elias (Ben Mendelsohn) his stripper girlfriend Petal (Jordana Spiro), his younger brother Jonah (Cam Gigandet) and a large intimidating man named Ty (Dash Mihok) - tell Kyle and Sarah that they have been spying on them for some time and are aware of the large amounts of cash and diamonds hidden in their home. They command Kyle to open a safe hidden in the wall but, despite the threat of a syringe containing lethal injection chemicals, he defiantly refuses, believing that he and Sarah will be killed if he simply gives in to their demands. Meanwhile, Sarah recognizes Jonah through his mask. Through a series of Jonah's flashbacks and a conversation with Elias, it is strongly implied that Sarah and Jonah had a previous affair when the latter was employed as a technician to install the house's security system. Unbeknownst to Elias, Sarah secretly steals the syringe from him during this conversation.

Having left her party in disgust (after the host Jake clumsily attempted to seduce her), Avery returns home and, after a brief chase, is also captured and taken to her parents. Elias appeals to Kyle, claiming that he needs money to pay for a kidney transplantation for his dying mother and that, if Kyle refuses to comply, he will instead take one of Avery's kidneys. Sarah catches Elias off-guard and holds him hostage with the syringe. Forced into a Mexican standoff, the thieves compromise by letting Avery escape in exchange for Kyle opening the safe. He does so, revealing it to be completely empty. Kyle explains that he is actually bankrupt and has no money; his house and all of his possessions were bought on loaned credit. Enraged, Elias breaks Kyle's hand and instead demands material compensation by taking Sarah's prized diamond necklace. However, Kyle reveals that this is a completely worthless cubic zirconia replica. Ty recaptures Avery from outside and brings her back into the house. Kyle volunteers for his own kidney to be taken instead of his daughter's, but Elias reveals that it was a ploy and that he hated his mother, who is already dead. Ty grows impatient after receiving a phone call and commands Elias to hurry up; Kyle realizes that the burglars are themselves being coerced into committing the heist against their will.

The thieves then separate the Miller family, with Kyle and Avery being tied up and guarded in the living room and Sarah being pursued by Jonah in the kitchen. Jonah states to Sarah that he still loves her and promises that she and Avery will be left unhurt. Meanwhile, Kyle uses a lighter to burn both his own and Avery's binds; they attempt an escape and set off the house's security system. Kyle ends up in a struggle with Ty and, despite Ty's superior strength and fighting skills, Kyle manages to inject a portion of the syringe chemicals into his arm, causing him to fall unconscious.

Thinking that Ty is dead, Elias shoots Kyle in the leg and reveals his true motives; that he is a drug dealer working for an organized crime syndicate. Shortly after being given a job to sell $180,000 worth of drugs, Elias and Petal were carjacked at gunpoint and all of their shipments were promptly stolen. Faced with threats of retribution, Elias was then forced to commit a heist (under the supervision of henchman Ty) to pay off his debt. Jonah, who had previously seen the Miller residence, suggested it as a place to rob.

Avery attempts to run out of the house again but is caught by Jonah. Under the threat of her parents being killed, she is forced to answer a call from the security company and successfully convinces them to call off the police. However, a security guard shows up nevertheless, prompting Jonah to kill him, when said guard recognizes Jonah as a former employee.

Kyle reveals to Elias that the only thing of any worth on him is his life insurance. Desperate and out of options, Elias kicks Kyle down and prepares to kill him. At the last second, Avery remembers the money she saw at the earlier party and pleads with the thieves that she can help them steal it from the party if they spare her father's life. Elias reluctantly agrees to the proposition and sends Petal to supervise Avery as she drives to the party house and ensure that she keeps her word (during a conversation between Elias and Petal it is revealed their daughter was taken into foster care). Although Avery's initial idea is to seduce Jake and then steal his money, she is horrified when Petal begins to deliriously proclaim that she plans to massacre all of the party guests and then take the cash. Seeing a swerving road ahead, Avery accelerates the car, unbuckles Petal's seat belt, and intentionally crashes into a telephone pole, incapacitating Petal and allowing Avery to handcuff Petal to the steering wheel.

Back at the Miller home, Sarah learns that Kyle had discovered a picture of her kissing Jonah from security footage and was suspicious for some time that she had been unfaithful. However, Sarah insists that she is innocent and only loves Kyle; the same flashback is now shown from her perspective, revealing that Jonah is in fact mentally ill (and off his medications) and that the supposed love affair between him and Sarah was all in his head. The "kiss" had occurred to Sarah's complete surprise and against her will. At this point, Ty reawakens from his stupor and attacks Sarah. Enraged, Jonah tackles Ty and the two fight. Just as Ty is about to strangle Jonah to death, Elias shoots him in the back for trying to kill his brother. However, in his dying breath, Ty reveals to Elias that he had been set up all along: the "robbers" stealing his drug shipment were actually fellow members of the same crime organization and the operation was done in order to blackmail him into stealing more money for them. More damningly, Ty also claims that Jonah had masterminded the entire plan so he could have an excuse to return to the Miller residence and profess his love to Sarah. Elias is shocked by the allegations but refuses to believe them (though doubt about his brother does seem to creep in).

Through the chaos, Sarah and a wounded Kyle escape to the tool shed behind the house and are pursued by Elias and Jonah. After a brief fight, the thieves break through a partition in their tussling and to their surprise discover a large amount of money that's been hidden in the shed; Kyle reveals that he had sold Sarah's real diamond necklace and was saving the money as a nest egg for his family when he noticed his business/fortunes declining. As Elias and Jonah begin to collect the cash, Avery appears (having survived the car crash with minor injuries) and points a gun at them. Elias calls her bluff and claims she can shoot but he will still have time to shoot one of her parents, he then aims his gun at Sarah - but he is shot from behind and killed by Jonah for this. Jonah tries again to convince Sarah that she belongs with him but she rebuffs his offers, calling him insane. In an attempt to sacrifice himself, Kyle tells his wife and daughter to run while setting the money in the tool shed on fire. He also shoots Jonah's foot with a nail gun, trapping him in the shed. While Avery goes to call the police, Sarah tries to help Kyle but she is grabbed in a last-ditch effort by Jonah, who is convinced that it is destiny for her to die together with him in the fire. However, Kyle then shoots him in the neck, causing him to fall and become engulfed in the flames. Sarah then carries Kyle away to safety just as the shed collapses.

In the backyard, Kyle tries to tell Sarah to let him die so that she and Avery can survive on his life insurance fund but she refuses, stating that she loves him regardless of whether he has money or not. Avery runs back to her parents announcing that help is finally on the way. The three family members embrace as the real police arrive and surround the house.

Cast

 Nicolas Cage as Kyle Miller
 Nicole Kidman as Sarah Miller
 Cam Gigandet as Jonah
 Jordana Spiro as Petal
 Ben Mendelsohn as Elias
 Liana Liberato as Avery Miller
 Dash Mihok as Ty
 Nico Tortorella as Jake
 Emily Meade as Kendra
 Terry Milam as Travis
 Brandon Belknap as Dylan
 Tina Parker as Security Operator
 Dave Maldonado as Security Guard
 Nilo Otero as Mr. Big
 Simona Williams as Mrs. Big
 Matthan Harris as Party Guest
 Christopher Márquez as Party Goer
 Caroline M. Schreiber as Party Girl
 Sam Velasquez as Party Boy
 Stephen Stanton
 Marchello Stewart as Date
 Gracie Whitton as Young Avery
 Joshua Wilkins as Partygoer

Production
Production was disrupted on August 3, 2010 when it was reported that Cage had abandoned the project as he had allegedly insisted on switching roles from Kidman's husband to the kidnapper. According to reports, the role was then offered to Liev Schreiber. However the following day Cage resumed his role as the husband. Due to the confusion over casting, the production start date was moved from August 16 to 30. Proof of filming showed up on Entertainment Weeklys online site. In the photo, Nicole Kidman and Nicolas Cage are being held at gunpoint. The film marks the second collaboration between Schumacher and cinematographer Andrzej Bartkowiak after working together on Falling Down. This is also Bartkowiak's first project in cinematography since he filmed Thirteen Days and began his career as a film director.

Reception

Critical response
Trespass was panned by critics and has a rating of 11% on Rotten Tomatoes based on 76 reviews with an average score of 3.3 out of 10. The consensus states: "Another claustrophobic thriller that Joel Schumacher can churn out in his sleep, Trespass is nasty and aggressive, more unpleasant than entertaining." Criticism focused primarily on the film's script and plot, including its great resemblance to the Spanish film Kidnapped. However, the film also received some positive reviews from mainstream critics, praising the performances of Kidman, Gigandet, and Mendelsohn.

Mary Pols of Time magazine named it one of the Top 10 Worst Movies of 2011. The film earned a Razzie Award nomination for Nicolas Cage as Worst Actor (also for Drive Angry and Season of the Witch), but lost to Adam Sandler for Jack and Jill and Just Go with It.

Box office
Trespass was given a limited release for one week in ten theaters in North America and earned $24,094 and an additional $9,988,226 internationally on a production budget of $35 million.

See also
 List of films featuring home invasions

References

External links
 
 
 
 
 
 

2011 films
2011 crime thriller films
2011 psychological thriller films
2011 thriller drama films
2010s heist films
American crime thriller films
American heist films
American psychological thriller films
American thriller drama films
2010s English-language films
Films about families
Films directed by Joel Schumacher
Films shot in Louisiana
Home invasions in film
Films about hostage takings
Nu Image films
Saturn Films films
2011 drama films
Films scored by David Buckley
Films set in country houses
2010s American films